The Connecticut Law Review is a quarterly law review produced by students of the University of Connecticut School of Law. It publishes more than 1,000 pages of critical legal discussion each year and is managed entirely by a student board of editors. The journal was established in 1968.

Abstracting and indexing
The journal is abstracted and indexed in EBSCO and ProQuest databases, as well as HeinOnline and Scopus (selected years only).

Notable alumni
Notable alumni include:
Christopher F. Droney, Circuit Judge of the United States Court of Appeals for the Second Circuit
Dennis G. Eveleigh, Justice of the Connecticut Supreme Court
Joan G. Margolis, United States Magistrate Judge for the District of Connecticut
Ingrid L. Moll, Class of 1999, Judge of the Connecticut Appellate Court 
Thomas P. Smith, United States Magistrate Judge for the District of Connecticut
Shauhin Talesh, professor, University of California, Irvine School of Law

See also
Connecticut Journal of International Law (est. 1985)
Connecticut Insurance Law Journal (est. 1994)
Connecticut Public Interest Law Journal (est. 2001)

References

External links

1968 establishments in Connecticut
American law journals
Connecticut law
English-language journals
General law journals
Law journals edited by students
Publications established in 1968
Quarterly journals
University of Connecticut